Andrea Celeste Thorisson Díaz (born 14 March 1998) is an Icelandic-Swedish footballer who plays as a forward for IFK Kalmar. She has an Icelandic father and a Peruvian mother.

Club career 
In October 2015, Thorisson made her Damallsvenskan debut for FC Rosengård in a 3–0 home win over Umeå IK. She was an 87th-minute substitute for Marta. Thorisson was one of six youth players to be given a first-team contract by Rosengård in December 2015.

In search of regular first-team football, Thorisson left FC Rosengård in 2018 and signed for Kungsbacka DFF of the second-tier Elitettan. Despite helping Kungsbacka to promotion Thorisson left after one season. She joined Limhamn Bunkeflo because she wanted to live near her family in Scania and was unhappy that Kungsbacka Municipality failed to provide financial support they had promised to Kungsbacka DFF.

International career 
When Thorisson was 12 years old she played well in a match against a touring Icelandic team. Her father told the opposition coach of her Icelandic heritage and the coach passed the information on to the Football Association of Iceland. Later Thorrison was approached to play for Iceland's youth national team through her Rosengård teammates Sara Björk Gunnarsdóttir and Þóra Björg Helgadóttir. Thorrison has also trained with Sweden's youth national teams at Bosön and as of 2016 remained undecided about which national team to represent at senior level.

Before the men's 2018 FIFA World Cup in Russia, Thorisson diplomatically stated that she was supporting Sweden, Iceland and Peru equally. Ultimately she decided to make herself eligible to represent Iceland at senior international level.

Honours

Club
FC Rosengård
 Damallsvenskan: 2015
 Svenska Cupen: 2015–16, 2016–17
 Svenska Supercupen: 2015, 2016

References

External links 
 
 
 
 Andrea Thorisson profile at Swedish Football Association 

1998 births
Living people
Andrea Thorisson
Swedish women's footballers
FC Rosengård players
Damallsvenskan players
Women's association football forwards
Footballers from Malmö
Swedish people of Icelandic descent
Swedish people of Peruvian descent
Andrea Thorisson
Kungsbacka DFF players
IF Limhamn Bunkeflo players
Iceland women's youth international footballers